Freycinetia is one of the five extant genera in the flowering plant family Pandanaceae. The genus comprises approximately 180–200 species, most of them climbers.

The species are distributed through the tropics and subtropics of South Asia and the western Pacific Ocean, from Sri Lanka eastwards through the mainland of Southeast Asia to the Melanesia floristic region, and southwards to northern Australia (Queensland, Northern Territory, northern New South Wales), Norfolk Island, and New Zealand. F. banksii is the only extant New Zealand member of the family Pandanaceae, and is found naturally as far south as the temperate South Island.

They have been found growing in tropical forests, coastal forests, humid mountain forests and associated biomes, from sea level to mountains cloud forests.

The genus was named by Charles Gaudichaud-Beaupré for Admiral Louis de Freycinet, a 19th-century French explorer.

Selected species

Freycinetia aculeata Sinaga – (New Guinea)
Freycinetia allantoidea A.P.Keim – (New Guinea)
Freycinetia arborea Gaudich. – Ieie (Pacific Is., Hawaii, Fr. Polynesia, Cook Is.)
Freycinetia auriculata Merr. – (Philippines)
Freycinetia banksii A.Cunn. – Kiekie (New Zealand)
Freycinetia berbakensis Pasaribu – (Malesia)
Freycinetia boninensis Nakai – (Bonin Islands endemic)
Freycinetia cumingiana Gaudich. – (Philippines)
Freycinetia daymanensis Huynh – (New Guinea)
Freycinetia delicata Huynh – (New Caledonia)
Freycinetia dewildeorum Pasaribu – (Malesia)
Freycinetia elegantula B.C.Stone – (New Guinea)
Freycinetia excelsa F.Muell. – (Australia, New Guinea)
Freycinetia formosana Hemsl. – (Taiwan, Philippines, Ryukyu Is. sthn Japan)
Freycinetia gunungmejensis Sinaga – (New Guinea)
Freycinetia imbricata Blume – (Philippines)
Freycinetia insueta Huynh – (New Guinea)
Freycinetia involuta Huynh – (New Caledonia)
Freycinetia javanica Blume – (Malesia)
Freycinetia kamialiensis Huynh – (New Guinea)
Freycinetia kartawinatae A.P.Keim – (Malesia)
Freycinetia kwerbaensis A.P.Keim – (New Guinea)
Freycinetia leuserensis Pasaribu – (Malesia)
Freycinetia luzonensis C.Presl – (Philippines)
Freycinetia marginata Blume – (Australia, New Guinea)
Freycinetia mariannensis Merr. – (Mariana Islands)
Freycinetia maxima Merr. – (Philippines)
Freycinetia modica Huynh – (New Caledonia)
Freycinetia multiflora Merr. – (Philippines)
Freycinetia neoglaucescens Huynh – (New Guinea)
Freycinetia panica Huynh – (New Caledonia)
Freycinetia percostata Merr. & L.M.Perry – (Australia, New Guinea, Solomon Is.)
Freycinetia ponapensis Martelli – (Pohnpei, Caroline Islands)
Freycinetia pseudograminifolia Huynh – (New Caledonia)
Freycinetia rubripedata Huynh – (New Guinea)
Freycinetia runcingensis A.P.Keim – (Malesia)
Freycinetia scabrosa Pasaribu – (Malesia)
Freycinetia scandens Gaudich. – (Australia, New Guinea, Malesia)
Freycinetia scitula Huynh – (New Guinea)
Freycinetia separata Huynh – (New Caledonia)
Freycinetia spinifera A.P.Keim – (New Guinea)
Freycinetia starensis Huynh – (New Guinea)
Freycinetia storckii Seem. – (Fiji)
Freycinetia streimannii A.P.Keim – (New Guinea)
Freycinetia subracemosa A.P.Keim – (Malesia)
Freycinetia subulata Huynh – (New Caledonia)
Freycinetia sumatrana Hemsl. – (Malesia)
Freycinetia sumbawaensis A.P.Keim & M.Rahayu – (Malesia)
Freycinetia urvilleana Hombr. & Jacq. – (Timor, Pacific Is.)
 Synonym: F. milnei Seem.
Freycinetia wamenaensis A.P.Keim – (New Guinea)
Freycinetia williamsii Merr. – (Taiwan, Ryukyu Islands sthn Japan)

References 

 Germplasm Resources Information Network: Freycinetia
 
 Freycinetia of Sumatra

Cited works 
 

 
Pandanales genera